Eight Skull (ruled ? - c. 790) was one of two known rulers of Ixkun, Mayan city. His successor was Rabbit God K.

Stela 2 records two battles, one against Sacul on 21 December 779 and the other against Ucanal on 10 May 780. It is said on the stela that Eight Skull was a predecessor of Rabbit God K. The text is incomplete.

Stela 12 is believed to have been dedicated by Eight Skull.

Notes

References

Kings of Ixkun
8th century in Guatemala